Leonard Joseph Victor Compagno is an international authority on shark taxonomy and the author of many scientific papers and books on the subject, best known of which is his 1984 catalogue of shark species produced for the Food and Agriculture Organization (FAO) of the United Nations. Compagno was mentioned in the credits of the 1975 film Jaws along with the National Geographic Society.

Career
Ph.D, Stanford University, 1979
Adjunct professor, San Francisco State University, 1979 to 1985
Curator of Fishes in the Division of Life Sciences and Head of the Shark Research Centre (SRC), Iziko Museums, Cape Town
Director, Shark Research Institute(SRI)

Selected bibliography
Compagno, L.J.V., 1979. Carcharhinoid sharks: morphology, systematics and phylogeny. Unpublished Ph. D. Thesis, Stanford University, 932 p. Available from University Microfilms International, Ann Arbor, Michigan.
Leonard Compagno, 1984a. FAO species catalogue. Vol. 4. Sharks of the world. An annotated and illustrated catalogue of sharks species known to date. Part 1. Hexanchiformes to Lamniformes. FAO Fish Synop., (125)Vol.4, Pt.1: 249 p. - A copy is available online at Fao.org
Leonard Compagno, 1984b. FAO species catalogue. Vol. 4. Sharks of the world. An annotated and illustrated catalogue of shark species known to date. Part 2. Carcharhiniformes. FAO Fish.Synop., (125) Vol.4, Pt.2: 251-655 - A copy is available online at Fao.org
Leonard Compagno, 1988. Sharks of the Order Carcharhiniformes. Princeton University Press, Princeton, New Jersey, 486 pp + 21 Figures, + 35 Plates. 
Leonard Compagno, 1999. Checklist of living elasmobranches, p. 471-498. In: W.C. Hamlett, ed. Sharks, skates and rays: the biology of elasmobranchs fishes, Johns Hopkins University Press. Maryland, 515 pp. - A partial copy is available online at Google.books.it
Leonard Compagno, 2001. Sharks of the world. An annotated and illustrated catalogue of shark species known to date. Vol. 2. Bullhead, mackerel, and carpet sharks (Heterodontiformes, Lamniformes and Orectolobiformes). FAO Species Catalogue for Fishery Purposes. No 1, Vol. 2. Roma, FAO. 269 pp. - A copy is available online at  Fao.org
Leonard Compagno, Dando M., Fowler S., 2005. A Field Guide to the Sharks of the World. HarperCollins Publishers Ltd.,London. 368 pp., 64 colour plates. Princeton Field Guide: .  Collins Field Guide: .

Taxon described by him
See :Category:Taxa named by Leonard Compagno

References

External links
 Full list of publications while at SRC

Year of birth missing (living people)
Living people
American ichthyologists